Felicita Colombo is a 1937 Italian "white-telephones" comedy film directed by Mario Mattoli and starring Dina Galli, Armando Falconi and Giuseppe Porelli.

It was shot at the recently constructed Cinecittà Studios in Rome. It was followed by a sequel Nonna Felicita in 1938.

Synopsis
Felicità Colombo runs a successful grocery business in Milan, and has become fairly wealthy. Her daughter Rosetta wishes to marry Nicolino, the son of an impoverished count, but his father opposes the marriage.

Cast
Dina Galli as Felicità Colombo 
 Armando Falconi as Il conte Scotti 
 Giuseppe Porelli as Nicolino 
 Roberta Mari as Rosetta 
 Paolo Varna as Valeriano Scotti - detto Larry 
 Angelo Gandolfi as L'amministratore ragionier Grossi 
 Giovanni Barrella as Carletto 
 Nando Tamberlani as Giovannk 
 Edda Soligo as Una cliente pettegola 
 Olinto Cristina as L'ingegner Hirsch 
 Emilio Petacci as Il fattore

References

Bibliography
 Goble, Alan. The Complete Index to Literary Sources in Film. Walter de Gruyter, 1999.

External links 
 
 Felicità Colombo at Variety Distribution

1937 films
Italian black-and-white films
1930s Italian-language films
1937 comedy films
Films directed by Mario Mattoli
Films set in Milan
Italian comedy films
Films shot at Cinecittà Studios
Italian films based on plays
1930s Italian films